Gambierdiscus carpenteri is a species of toxic dinoflagellate, which among others causes ciguatera fish poisoning. It is photosynthetic and epibenthic.

References

Further reading
Litaker, R. Wayne, et al. "Global distribution of ciguatera causing dinoflagellates in the genus Gambierdiscus." Toxicon 56.5 (2010): 711-730.
Kibler, Steven R., et al. "Growth of eight Gambierdiscus (Dinophyceae) species: Effects of temperature, salinity and irradiance." Harmful Algae 19 (2012): 1-14.

External links

AlgaeBase

Gonyaulacales
Protists described in 2009